Christ the King is a title of Jesus.

Christ the King may also refer to:

Feast of Christ the King, observed in the Catholic Church, and many Protestant churches, since 1925

Cathedrals and churches
Christ the King Cathedral (disambiguation), the name of many church buildings around the world
Christ the King Anglican Church, Birmingham, Alabama, United States
Christ the King Catholic Church in Kahului, Hawaii, United States
Christ the King Graceland Independent Anglican Church of Canada, Newmarket, Ontario, Canada
Church of Christ the King, Bloomsbury, London, England
Christ the King, Cockfosters, London, England: former priory now parish church and spirituality centre

Schools
Christ the King School (disambiguation)
Christ the King (Georgetown, Ontario), a secondary school
Christ the King Anglican College, Cobram, Victoria, Australia
Christ the King Catholic Voluntary Academy, Arnold, Nottinghamshire, England
Christ the King College, Sierra Leone, Africa
Christ the King College, Isle of Wight, Isle of Wight, England
Christ the King Seminary (East Aurora, New York)
Christ the King Seminary, Philippines
Christ the King Seminary (Pakistan)
Christ the King Sixth Form College, Lewisham, England
Seminary of Christ the King, British Columbia, Canada

Other
Anglican Diocese of Christ the King, in southern Africa
Anglican Province of Christ the King, a part of the Continuing Anglican movement in the United States
Christ the King Priory, a monastery of Missionary Benedictines in Schuyler, Nebraska, United States
Christ the King Priory (Uganda), a monastery of Missionary Benedictines in Tororo, Uganda
Community of Christ the King, an order of Anglican nuns
Franciscan Missionaries of Christ the King, a Roman Catholic religious congregation
Institute of Christ the King Sovereign Priest, an order of Catholic priests

Statues
Christ the King (Świebodzin), a statue in Świebodzin, Poland
Christ the King (Dili)
Christ the King (Almada)
Christ the King (Aherlow)
Christ the King (Lubango)
Christ the King (Madeira)
Cristo Rey (Colombian statue)
Cristo Rey (Mexican statue)

See also
Cristo Rei (disambiguation), Portuguese translation of "Christ the King"
Cristo Rey (disambiguation), Spanish translation of "Christ the King"
King of the Jews (disambiguation)